Patricia Hall is the pseudonym used by journalist Maureen O'Connor in writing crime novels featuring reporter Laura Ackroyd and DCI Michael Thackeray.

Biography
Maureen O'Connor was born in Bradford, West Yorkshire in 1940. She graduated from Birmingham University and worked at the BBC, and Evening Standard. She then spent 16 years creating, editing and writing for the education section of The Guardian before switching to freelance journalism and fiction writing. She has a husband and two sons and lives in Oxford.

Writing
The major series produced by Hall features reporter Laura Ackroyd and police detective Michael Thackeray. The series is set in Bradford and 
confronts issues of 'environmentalism, class and race discrimination'.

She has now started writing a new series based around photographer Kate O'Donnell and set in 1960s London.

Bibliography

Ackroyd and Thackeray series
 Death by Election (1993)
 Dying Fall (1994)
 In the Bleak Midwinter (1995) a.k.a. The Dead of Winter
 Perils Of The Night (1997)
 The Italian Girl (1998)
 Dead on Arrival (1999)
 Skeleton at the Feast (2000)
 Deep Freeze (2001)
 Death in Dark Waters (2002)
 Dead Reckoning (2003)
 False Witness (2004)
 Sins of the Fathers (2005)
 Death in a Far Country (2007)
 By Death Divided (2008)
 Devil's Game (2009)
 Dust to Dust (2011)

Kate O'Donnell series
 Dead Beat (2011)
 Death Trap (2012)
 Dressed to Kill (2013)
 Blood Brothers (2014)
 Deep Waters (2016)
 Cover Up (2017)
 Playing with Fire (2018)

Other novels
 The Poison Pool (1991)
 The Coldness of Killers (1992)
 The Masks of Darkness (2004)

References

External links

1940 births
Living people
Writers from Bradford
English crime fiction writers
Writers from Oxford
Alumni of the University of Birmingham
The Guardian journalists
English women novelists
Women mystery writers
20th-century English novelists
20th-century English women writers
21st-century English novelists
21st-century English women writers